The Theme of Macedonia was a military-civilian province (theme) of the Byzantine Empire established between the late 8th century and the early 9th century.  Byzantine Macedonia had limited geographical relation to the Ancient Macedonia and mainly lay in what is now the modern region of Southern Thrace. Its capital was Adrianople.

History
From the beginning of the 6th century, the former Roman Diocese of Macedonia, then part of the Byzantine Empire became a subject to frequent raids by Slavic tribes which in the course of next centuries, resulted in drastic demographic and cultural changes. The Slavs organized themselves into "Sklaviniai", that continued to assault the Byzantine Empire, either independently, or aided by Bulgars or Avars during the 7th century. In the late 7th century, the Byzantines organized a massive expedition against the Slavs in the area. They subdued many Slavic tribes and established a new theme of Thrace in the hinterland of Thessaloniki. Despite these temporary successes, the rule in the region was far from stable. The Empire instead resorted to withdraw its defense-line south along the Aegean coast, until the late 8th century.

As a consequence, a new theme called Macedonia was created between 789 (or 797) and 801/802 by the Empress Irene of Athens, from the older theme of Thrace. Sigillographic evidence shows that a tourma ("division") named "Macedonia" existed before, subordinated to the strategos of Thrace.  The first known strategos of Macedonia, the patrikios John Aplakes, was mentioned in 813, but Theophanes the Confessor mentioned Leo, brother of the eunuch chamberlain Aetios, being appointed as the monostrategos ("single-general", placed in command over two or more themes) of Thrace and Macedonia already in 801/802. Its creation came in the aftermath of a series of military successes that had extended Byzantine reach over most of the wider region of Thrace, and was probably intended to make imperial control more efficient by entrusting the greatly expanded territory to two strategoi.

Although the theme was attested in the 960s, its absence in the Escorial Taktikon of c. 975 has led to the supposition that it may have been abolished and subsumed into the command of the new doux of Adrianople. However, the theme of Macedonia was attested again in 1006/7, and there is some sigillographic evidence to support its continued existence alongside the doukaton of Adrianople. In the late 10th century, as a result of the conquests of John I Tzimiskes (r. 969–976) and Basil II (r. 976–1025), the theme of Macedonia ceased being a border theme; to its north, it was bounded by new provinces centred on Philippopolis and Beroe, while to its south, the new theme of Boleron came into existence in the early 11th century.

Little is known of the provincial organization in the 12th century. In an imperial chrysobull to the Venetians dating to 1198, "Thrace and Macedonia" appear as a single territorial entity describing all of Thrace, but it was subdivided into smaller units centred on the major cities. The core area of the old theme of Macedonia was recorded as the "province of Adrianople and Didymoteichon" (provincia Adrianupoleos et Didimotichi).

Geography and administration

The seat of the new theme was Adrianople (modern Edirne), and it comprised modern Western Thrace (in Greece), the western parts of Eastern Thrace (European Turkey), and the southern fringes of Northern Thrace (southern Bulgaria). The Arab geographers Ibn Khordadbeh (wrote c. 847) and Ibn al-Faqih (wrote c. 903), whose accounts are a major source on the Byzantine themes, mentioned that the theme of Macedonia (Maqaduniya) extended from the "Long Wall" (the Anastasian Wall) to the "lands of the Slavs" in the west, and from the Aegean and Marmara Seas to the borders of Bulgaria to the north. In later days, to the west it bounded the theme of Thessalonica and the later themes of Strymon and Boleron. Thus, the theme of Macedonia had no relation to the historical region of Macedonia, and when Byzantine sources of the 10th to 12th centuries refer to "Macedonia", they mean the area of western Thrace. Hence, for instance, the emperor Basil I "the Macedonian" (r. 867–886) hailed from Thrace, and the Macedonian dynasty he founded was named after the theme of Macedonia.

Being derived from the theme of Thrace, Macedonia was counted among the "Eastern" themes, which ranked higher in Byzantine hierarchy than the "Western" themes. In the late 9th and 10th centuries, its strategos ranked in the second tier of thematic governors, above even that of Thrace. He received an annual salary of 36 pounds of gold (2,592 nomismata), and, according to the account of Ibn al-Faqih, in the late 9th century controlled 5,000 troops. A number of tagmatic soldiers were also permanently stationed in the theme. Strymon, which was originally a kleisoura of Macedonia, was split off sometime in the early 9th century, taking some 2,000 men (according to the estimate of historian Warren Treadgold) along with it.

As with other themes, at least some of the administrative posts of Macedonia were sometimes combined with those of Thrace, especially in the 11th century, where numerous strategoi and judges (kritai) are attested holding jurisdiction over both themes.

References

Sources

External links

Themes of the Byzantine Empire
Byzantine Greece
Macedonia (ancient kingdom)
Macedonian dynasty
Medieval Thrace
States and territories established in the 8th century
States and territories disestablished in the 11th century
8th-century establishments in Europe
11th-century disestablishments in Europe
Geography of medieval Thrace